Urban construction may refer to:

Urbanization or urban planning
Tianjin Urban Construction Institute
Ministry of Housing and Urban-Rural Development of the People's Republic of China